Llanddyfnan is a village and community in Anglesey, Wales, located  north east of Llangefni,  north west of Menai Bridge and  west of Beaumaris.

Description
The community includes the villages of Capel Coch, Ceint, Llanddyfnan, Llangwyllog, Maenaddwyn, Mynydd Bodafon (also the name of the highest point of the main island of Anglesey), Talwrn, Llanfihangel Tre'r Beirdd and Tregaian, and at the 2001 census had a population of 1,027.

Churches
Three of the community's churches are Grade II* listed. Saint Caian's Church at Tregaian dates from at least the 14th century, and contains a window from that period. The south doorway dates from the 15th century, and the pulpit contains 17th century panelling. The circular font dates from the 12th century. Saint Cwyllog's Church at Llangwyllog is thought to date from around 1200, and is mentioned in the Norwich Taxation of 1254, although the earliest dateable features are a doorway and window from the 15th century. The fittings are mainly from the late 18th century, and include a pulpit and reading desk. In the village of Llanddyfnan is Saint Dyfnan's Church, dating from the 14th century, and which includes a doorway to the nave with a two-centred head and carved nude figures. The churchyard includes the graves of some of the victims of the Royal Charter shipwreck of 1859. The ship, travelling from Melbourne to Liverpool with 371 passengers and 112 crew, was driven onto rocks at Moelfre by  winds. Over 450 people died. The aftermath was reported by Charles Dickens in The Uncommercial Traveller, and the disaster led the Meteorological Office to introduce the first gale warnings.

Nature reserves
Cors Bodeilio, near Talwrn, is a national nature reserve and wetland of international importance.  It is a mire in a shallow limestone valley, where fen species prosper.  The site contains uncommon species, including fen pondweed, orchids, curlews, lapwings and snipes.  Cors Erddreiniog, also a national nature reserve and located north east of Tregaian, has been described as the "Jewel in the crown of the Anglesey fens" and is home to the bog myrtle, marsh gentian, southern damselfly and hen harrier.

Governance
Most of the community lies within the Canolbarth Môn electoral ward, which is represented by three county councillors on the Isle of Anglesey County Council. The northern 'finger' of the community, including Capel Coch and Maenaddwyn, lies in the Lligwy ward.

Llanddyfnan has a community council, with ten community councillors.

References

External links 

 A Vision of Britain Through Time
 British Listed Buildings
 Genuki
 Geograph
 Office for National Statistics

 
Burial sites of the Children of Brychan